James Bostic (born January 28, 1953) is a retired American basketball player.

Born in Yonkers, New York, he played in college for New Mexico State University.

He was selected by the Kansas City Kings in the 8th round (139th pick overall) of the 1975 NBA draft.

He was under contract with the Kings (September–October 1975) and San Antonio Spurs (July–October 1977), but did not play in the NBA for these teams.

He played for the Detroit Pistons (1977–78) in the NBA for 4 games.

References

External links

 REALGM player profile

1953 births
Living people
Basketball players from New York (state)
Detroit Pistons players
Forwards (basketball)
Jersey Shore Bullets players
Lancaster Red Roses (CBA) players
Kansas City Kings draft picks
New Mexico State Aggies men's basketball players
Sportspeople from Yonkers, New York
American men's basketball players
United States Basketball League players